Statistics of Primera División Uruguaya for the 2002 season.

Overview
It was contested by 18 teams, and Nacional won the championship.

Classification

Group A

Group B

Group C

Overall

Champions

Apertura

Clausura

Playoff
Danubio 1-2 ; 1-2 Nacional
Nacional won the championship.

Relegation group

Group A

Group B

References
Uruguay - List of final tables (RSSSF)

Uruguayan Primera División seasons
Uru
1